Kenbrell Thompkins  (born July 29, 1988) is a former American football wide receiver. He played college football for El Camino College from 2008 to 2009 and for the University of Cincinnati from 2011 to 2012. He was signed as an undrafted free agent by the New England Patriots in 2013 and was also a member of the Oakland Raiders and New York Jets.

Early years
A native of the Liberty City neighborhood of Miami, Thompkins attended Miami Northwestern High School. A classmate of NFL cornerback Anthony Gaitor, Thompkins started for Northwestern, but was academically ineligible to play as a sophomore and was later expelled for violating school policy. He was allowed to re-enroll prior to his junior football season, only to be expelled again later in the year. After spending his junior year at an alternative school, he re-enrolled at Northwestern for the third time prior to his senior year and finished his high school football career. Not long after the season concluded, Thompkins was expelled for the third time, after being arrested on armed robbery charges.

College career
Thompkins briefly attended Palomar College in San Marcos, California in 2008 before transferring to El Camino College in Torrance, California to play football. At El Camino College, Thompkins recorded two 1,000-yard seasons in a row, being named a team captain as a sophomore. Following his sophomore campaign, Thompkins signed with the University of Tennessee in order to play under then-coach Lane Kiffin; following Kiffin's departure to become head coach of the USC Trojans football team, Thompkins transferred to the University of Oklahoma Sooners, but did not play at either university, as Oklahoma has a strict policy against admitting students with a history of legal troubles. Instead, Thompkins transferred to the University of Cincinnati, where he played for two seasons from 2011 to 2012.

As a junior in 2011, Thompkins caught 44 passes for 536 yards (12.2 yards per reception) and two touchdowns. As a senior in 2012, he recorded 34 receptions for 541 yards (15.9) and two touchdowns.

Professional career

New England Patriots
Thompkins signed with the New England Patriots as an undrafted free agent on May 3, 2013. In his preseason debut, Thompkins registered 4 receptions for 23 yards with the first-team offense against the Philadelphia Eagles. In the third game of the season, Thompkins caught the first two touchdown passes of his career to help the Patriots win the game 23–3 against the Tampa Bay Buccaneers. In Week 6's matchup against the undefeated New Orleans Saints, Thompkins caught the game-winning touchdown on a 2nd down play with 5 seconds remaining in the game. Thompkins was released by the Patriots on October 4, 2014.

Oakland Raiders
Thompkins was claimed off waivers by the Oakland Raiders two days after his release from the Patriots, on October 6, 2014. He caught 15 passes in 12 games for 209 yards with Oakland and was cut by Oakland on September 1, 2015.

New England Patriots (second stint) 
The Patriots re-signed Thompkins to their practice squad on September 6, 2015. He was released from the practice squad on September 30, 2015.

New York Jets
On October 2, 2015, the New York Jets signed Thompkins to their practice squad. He was promoted to the active roster on October 20, 2015, after Quincy Enunwa was suspended. On September 3, 2016, Thompkins was released by the Jets as part of their final roster cuts.

On August 16, 2017, Thompkins re-signed with the Jets. On September 2, 2017, Thompkins was released by the Jets.

Winnipeg Blue Bombers 
On May 22, 2018, the Winnipeg Blue Bombers of the Canadian Football League (CFL) announced they had signed Thompkins to a contract. He was shifted to the team's practice roster on June 28, then promoted back to the active roster on July 26. He was placed on the suspended list on May 19, 2019, then released on July 11.

NFL career statistics

Personal life
Thompkins is the cousin of wide receiver Antonio Brown and also has a younger brother Kendal Thompkins who played in the Arena Football League.

Thompkins was charged by the U.S. federal government with access device fraud and aggravated identity theft on March 26, 2021, after prosecutors alleged that he stole $300,000 in unemployment benefits from the state of California. He pled guilty to these charges in October 2021. In January 2022, he was sentenced to 25 months in prison and was required to return $132,980.

References

External links
Cincinnati Bearcats biography
New England Patriots biography

1988 births
Living people
American football wide receivers
Cincinnati Bearcats football players
New England Patriots players
Oakland Raiders players
New York Jets players
Palomar Comets football players
Players of American football from Miami
El Camino College alumni
Winnipeg Blue Bombers players
Canadian football wide receivers
American players of Canadian football
Miami Northwestern Senior High School alumni
Players of Canadian football from Miami